Ulubey Canyon Nature Park is a nature park in the Ulubey and Karahallı districts of Uşak Province, Turkey. The canyon is the second longest in the world after the Grand Canyon in the United States. The park provides suitable habitat for many species of animals and plants and is being developed as a centre for ecotourism.

Canyon
The streams Ulubey Creek and Banaz Creek (tributaries of Büyük Menderes River) run through the Ulubey Canyon. The main canyon along both creeks has tens of big lateral canyons. At least three terraces are visible in the canyon walls. In addition, there are many conical karstic hills along the canyon.

Climate
Being in a transitional zone between the Aegean and Central Anatolia regions, Uşak Province exhibits the climate characteristics of both regions. The summer months are warmer and more arid than in the Aegean region, and the winter season is milder than in the Central Anatolian region. Rain brought by air masses from over the Aegean Sea generates a more humid climate than in Central Anatolia. Monthly or seasonal distribution of precipitation is irregular.

Ecology

Flora
Plants growing in the nature park include the Turkish pine (Pinus brutia), rockrose (Cistus), oak (Quercus ithaburensis), Turkey oak (Quercus cerris), salt cedar (Tamarix), sumac (Rhus), hackberry (Celtis), broom (Genista), mullein  (Verbascum), milkvetch (Astragalus) and wild marjoram (Origanum).

Fauna
The nature park provides suitable habitat for mammals such as the wild boar, hare, fox, jackal, gray wolf (Canis lupus), Indian porcupine (Hystrix indica), porcupine and jerboa, the reptiles tortoise, striped viper (Montivipera xanthina), the bird species red-legged partridge, common buzzard, hawk, common raven (Corvus corax), the fish species European chub (Squalius cephalus), catfish and the insect species multiple-eyespotted blue butterfly.

Ecotourism
The area hosted many civilizations in the past including Lydia, Achaemenid Empire, Macedonia, Kingdom of Pergamon, Roman Empire, Byzantine Empire, Germiyanids and finally Ottoman Empire.

The canyon system of Banaz-Ulubey has a significant potential for ecotourism in the country. In August 2013, the canyon was declared a nature park by the Ministry of Forest and Water Management. Hiking, trekking and camping using tents are popular outdoor activities in the canyon area. It was reported in June 2015 that about 40,000 tourists visited the nature park in one month. The number of visitors in one month rose to nearly 100,000 by March 2016.

Notable places in the region are Cilandiras Bridge, Duraklı Rock-cut tombs, Hasköy monuments, Pepuza, and Blaundus ancient towns, and Salma Creek.

Access
The nature park is situated in the districts of Ulubey and Karahallı of Uşak Province on the road Uşak-Karahallı. Public transport is available between the two locations throughout the day.

References 

Canyons and gorges of Turkey
Landforms of Uşak Province
Nature parks in Turkey
Protected areas established in 2013
2013 establishments in Turkey
Tourist attractions in Uşak Province
Ulubey District
Karahallı District